St. John's United Church of Christ, originally known as St. John's Evangelical Protestant Church, is a historic United Church of Christ church located in downtown Evansville, Indiana. St. John's Parish Hall was built in 1921, and is a Tudor Revival style brick building.

It was listed on the National Register of Historic Places in 1982.

References

United Church of Christ churches in Indiana
Churches on the National Register of Historic Places in Indiana
Tudor Revival architecture in Indiana
Churches completed in 1921
Churches in Evansville, Indiana
National Register of Historic Places in Evansville, Indiana